Miyanishin District is a new district of Kandahar District, Afghanistan, created in 2005. It was formerly in the northern part of Shah Wali Kot District. The population is 16,713 (2019).

References

External links
AIMS District Map

Districts of Kandahar Province